"Never have I ever", also known as "I've never..." or "ten fingers", is a drinking game in which players take turns asking other players about things they have not done. Other players who have done this thing respond by taking a drink. A version that requires no drinking, usually played by children and underage adolescents, has players counting scores on their fingers instead.

Rules 
The verbal game starts with all players forming a circle. The first player starts by saying a simple statement about something they have never done before starting with "Never have I ever". Anyone who at some point in their life has done the action that the first player says must drink. Then the game continues around the circle, and the next person makes a statement.

An additional rule says that if there is no one taking a drink, then the one who said the particular "Never have I ever..." statement must take a drink. This rule often forces the players to strategize more and makes for less disposable or pointless suggestions.

A further variation holds that whenever only one person is drinking, that person must give a detailed account of why they are drinking. Another variety of this game involves putting up five or ten fingers, putting one down whenever something mentioned has been done. Those who end up putting down all of their fingers must take several successive drinks.

There are versions of the game available on cards or online with pre-written statements which players must admit to have done or not.

Conversation games such as this one can help to build friendships, and players often admit to things that they previously had not. As with truth or dare? the game is often sexual in nature. In some variations, the game may be incorporated into other drinking games, such as kings.

In popular culture 
In the Family Guy episode "The Perfect Castaway", Peter and his friends play the game (referred to "I never"). However, Quagmire has pretty much done everything the gang has said they never did. (e.g. "I never gave a reach-around to a spider monkey while reciting the Pledge of Allegiance.")
In 2015 Under the Gun Theater, a Chicago-based theater company, created an interactive comedy show based on the party game. This was in response to the closing of their show based on Cards Against Humanity.
In the 2014 horror film Unfriended, the ghost of Laura Barns forces those who drove her to suicide into a game of NHIE, during which a number of secrets are revealed which severely damage the players' friendships.

See also 
 List of drinking games
 Conversation games
 Purity test

References 

Drinking games